Jakeš is a village in Vukosavlje municipality, Bosnia and Herzegovina. It may also refer to:

 Miloš Jakeš (b. 1922), General Secretary of the Communist Party of Czechoslovakia
 Petr Jakeš (1940–2005), Czech geologist

See also
 Jakes (disambiguation)